Mike-Mayer is a surname. Notable people with the surname include:

Nick Mike-Mayer (born 1950), American football player
Steve Mike-Mayer (born 1947), American football player

See also
Mike Mayer, American writer
Michael Mayer (disambiguation)
Mike (disambiguation)
Mayer (disambiguation)

Compound surnames
English-language surnames